Bonnie Burroughs (born February 3, 1961) is an American film and television actress. She is recognized for playing the role of Gladys Corbin on the soap opera General Hospital.

Early life 
Burroughs was born in Atlanta, Georgia.

Career 
Burroughs guest-starred in numerous television programs including Newhart, Boston Legal, Judging Amy, Suddenly Susan, Malcolm in the Middle, My Two Dads, Desperate Housewives, CSI: Crime Scene Investigation, Dallas, Jake and the Fatman, ER, Hunter and Matlock. She was cast as Stacey Giordano on One Life to Live from 1987. Burroughs was then cast as Dr. Jamie Lawrence on Santa Barbara from 1990 to 1991. She was also cast as Gretchen Lindquist on Days of Our Lives. In 2009, Burroughs starred on the television series Rockville, CA, being cast as Shawn Petrers.

In 2019, Burroughs was cast as Gladys Corbin on General Hospital.

Filmography

Film

Television

References

External links 

Rotten Tomatoes profile

1961 births
Living people
Actresses from Atlanta
American film actresses
American television actresses
American soap opera actresses
20th-century American actresses
21st-century American actresses